Kizilyurtovsky District (Qızılyurt yaq) is an administrative and municipal district (raion), one of the forty-one in the Republic of Dagestan, Russia. It is located in the center of the republic. Its administrative center is the town of Kizilyurt (which is not administratively a part of the district). As of the 2010 Census, the total population of the district was 61,876.

Administrative and municipal status
Within the framework of administrative divisions, Kizilyurtovsky District is one of the forty-one in the republic. It is divided into three selsoviets, comprising sixteen rural localities. The town of Kizilyurt serves as its administrative center, despite being incorporated separately as an administrative unit with the status equal to that of the districts.

As a municipal division, the district is incorporated as Kizilyurtovsky Municipal District. Its three selsoviets are incorporated as thirteen rural settlements within the municipal district. The Town of Kizilyurt is incorporated separately from the district as Kizilyurt Urban Okrug, but serves as the administrative center of the municipal district as well.

References

Notes

Sources

Districts of Dagestan
